Events from the year 1493 in Ireland.

Incumbent
Lord: Henry VII

Events
 Rathmacknee Castle is, by some accounts, built by Thomas Rossiter, seneschal of the Liberty of Wexford.
 First recorded reference to the River Poddle in Dublin.

Births

Deaths
 Teige Mac Con Midhe, Irish poet and writer

References

 
1490s in Ireland
Ireland
Years of the 15th century in Ireland